Isophyllaria is a genus of liverworts belonging to the family Pseudolepicoleaceae.

The species of this genus are found in Australia and New Zealand.

Species:

Isophyllaria attenuata 
Isophyllaria fuegiana

References

Jungermanniales
Jungermanniales genera